= Paluvai =

- Census town
- Location in Kerala, India
- Coordinates: 10.5572500°N 76.045060°E
- Country: India
- State: Kerala
- District: Thrissur

Population (2001)
  - Total: 7,206

Languages
  - Official: Malayalam, English
- Time zone: UTC+5:30 (IST)
- PIN: 680522
- Telephone code: 0487

Paluvai is a census town in Thrissur district in the Indian state of Kerala.

== Demographics ==
As of 1981 India census, Paluvai had a population of 7206. Males constituted 45% of the population and females 55%. The literacy rate was 84%, higher than the national average of 39.3%: male literacy was 83%, and female literacy was 85%. In Paluvai, 11% of the population is under 6 years of age. The town is under Guruvayur Municipality. Paluvai convent and school is one of the popular spots in Paluvai.
